Sam Abrams (born November 18, 1935) is an American poet. He was a Fulbright Professor of American Literature at the University of Athens and is a Professor Emeritus of Language and Literature in the College of Liberal Arts, Rochester Institute of Technology. He traveled extensively. He resides in Rochester, New York.

Education
Born in Brooklyn, Abrams is a graduate of James Madison High School (New York), Brooklyn College (B.A. 1958), and the University of Illinois at Urbana–Champaign (MA 1950).

Works
 Barbara. Ferry Press (London, 1966), 1st Edition. 32 pp. Poems, limited edition of 350 copies.
 The Neglected Walt Whitman. Sam Abrams, Editor. Sixty-five poems, fragments, and three prose pieces by Whitman.
 The Old Pothead Poems.
 The Post-American Cultural Congress.
 Book of Days, with Paul Blackburn.

References

External links
"The Purpose" by Sam Abrams

1935 births
Living people
Poets from New York (state)
Writers from Brooklyn
Writers from Rochester, New York]
New York School poets
Brooklyn College alumni
University of Illinois Urbana-Champaign alumni
Rochester Institute of Technology faculty
James Madison High School (Brooklyn) alumni
American expatriates in Greece